Krčenik  is a village in the municipality Podravska Moslavina, Osijek-Baranja County in Croatia. According to the 2001 census, there are 432 inhabitants, in 136 family households.

References 

Populated places in Osijek-Baranja County